Bani Adam (lit. humans or sons of Adam or sons of man) is a poem by Persian poet Saadi Shirazi.

Bani Adam or variant, may also refer to:

 "Bani Adam" (Coldplay song), a song by Coldplay off the album Everyday Life
 Bani Adam, a 2013 Emirati film; see Cinema of the United Arab Emirates
 Al Bani Adam (Sons of Adam), a 1945 Egyptian film by Abo El Seoud El Ebiary
 El Bani Adam (The Human Being), a 1945 Egyptian film by Niazi Mostafa
 "Bani Adam", a 1958 Bengali poem by Golam Mostofa
 Bani Adam, a fictional character from the 2018 novel The Lebs
 Ahmad Ali Bani-Adam, an Iranian politician and mayor of Shiraz

See also

 Banu Adam
 ben adam, a Hebrew Biblical term
 Human (disambiguation)
 Human Being (disambiguation)
 Sons of Adam (disambiguation)
 Son of man (disambiguation)
 Bani (disambiguation)
 Adam (disambiguation)